Emmanuel Bourgaud (born 25 October 1987) is a French professional footballer who plays for Olympique Saumur FC as a midfielder.

Career
Bourgaud began his career with Angers in 2005, where he made 51 appearances in Ligue 2, the second tier of the French football league system. He spent time on loan with Créteil in 2011, before being transferred to Vendée Poiré sur Vie later in the year. Bourgaud scored a late second goal in a 2–1 away win against Reims, to promote Amiens in the 2016–17 Ligue 2.

References

External links
 
 

1987 births
Living people
Sportspeople from Angers
French footballers
Association football midfielders
Angers SCO players
US Créteil-Lusitanos players
Vendée Poiré-sur-Vie Football players
SR Colmar players
Amiens SC players
Red Star F.C. players
Les Herbiers VF players
Olympique Saumur FC players
Ligue 1 players
Ligue 2 players
Championnat National players
Footballers from Pays de la Loire